The Nandavarta or Nandyavarta is one of the eight auspicious symbols of Jainism for the Svetambara sect. It is an ashtamangala which is used for worship, and could be made with rice grains. It is also the symbol of 18th Tirthankar Aranatha according to Śvētāmbara and 7th tirthankar Suparshvanatha according to digambar. The symbol has 4 arms with compulsorily 9 corners/ turns each.

References

Citation

Source 
  
 Nandyāvarta, an auspicious symbol in Indian art by A. L Srivastava (Book)

External links

Jain symbols
Hindu symbols
Symbols of Indian religions
Indian iconography